Xianyu is a town of Hetang District in Zhuzhou, Hunan, China. The town has 10 villages and a community under its jurisdiction, its seat is Xiajiaduan.

History
The town of Xianyu is originally Dieping Township. It ceased to be a township and was reformed as the town of Xianyu on December 18, 2001, it took its name after Xianyu Mountain.

The two villages of Shuaijiaduan and Dongyuanchong of Mingzhao Township were transferred to the town in 2005. Mingzhao Township was merged to the town in 2015.

Subdivisions
10 villages
 Dieping Village
 Dongshan Village
 Huangpotian Village
 Huangtang Village
 Lianxing Village
 Tingziqiang Village
 Xianyuling Village
 Xingtang Village
 Xujiatang Village
 Zhangxia Village

1 community
 Yongfu Community

References

Hetang District
Towns of Hunan